The Young Critics Circle - Film Desk is a society of film critics and an award-giving body for cinema in the Philippines. It was established in 1990 and had its first awarding in 1991.

Establishment
In 1990, a group of young reviewers and critics decided to form a body that aimed to evaluate works of art in various disciplines (film, theater, music, literature, visual arts and broadcast arts). Founding members include Mike Feria, Joy Barrios, Jojo Buenconsejo, Eric Caruncho, Melissa Contreras, Jaime Daroy, Joel David, Gin de Mesa, Patrick Flores, Francine Medina, Charlson Ong, Mozart Pastrano, Danilo Reyes, and Antonio Tinio. Each member specialized on one or more disciplines or “desks”. At present, only the Film Desk is existing.

The Film Desk of the Young Critics Circle (YCC) first gave its annual citations in film achievement in 1991, a year after the YCC was organized. In their Declaration of Principles, the members expressed the belief that cultural texts always call for active readings, “interactions” in fact among different readers who have the “unique capacities to discern, to interpret, and to reflect… evolving a dynamic discourse in which the text provokes the most imaginative ideas of our time.”

The Film Desk has committed itself to the discussion of film in the various arenas of academe and media, with the hope of fostering an alternative and emergent articulation of film critical practice, even within the severely debilitating culture of "awards".

Members
The members of the YCC who review Filipino films and choose the winners of the annual YCC Citations are members of the academe coming from various disciplines, such art studies, literary studies, creative writing, anthropology, communication, philosophy, visual arts, Philippine studies, film studies, and history. Active members are:
 Aristotle Atienza
 John Bengan
 Christian Jil Benitez
 Ian Harvey Claros
 Emerald Flaviano
 Patrick Flores
 Tessa Maria Guazon
 Skilty C. Labastilla
 Nonoy L. Lauzon
 Janus Nolasco
 Judith Camille Rosette
 Tito Quiling Jr.
 Jaime Oscar M. Salazar
 Cristian Tablazon
 Andrea Anne Trinidad, president of YCC (2022-2023)

Awards
YCC draws its selection from both regular and non-regular releases comprising the entirety of annual Philippine cinema output. Films considered for discussion are those that had at least two screenings before a paying or non-paying audience in any public venue. The group first comes up with a long list, where each film on the list is discussed as to its merits and demerits. The list is further narrowed down to a shortlist of any number. Only short-listed films earn the privilege to be nominated for any of the six main categories that are handed out each year. Except for the Best First Feature category, YCC does not confer nominations on artistic or technical merit if the film does not qualify in the short list.

The six awards handed out since 1990 are:
 Best Film
 Best Performance
 Best Screenplay
 Best Achievement in Editing
 Best Achievement in Cinematography and Visual Design
 Best Achievement in Sound and Aural Orchestration.

In 2013, the group added a new category, Best First Feature, to be given to filmmakers who directed the three best debut feature films of the year.

Winners

Best Film 
The Young Critics Circle Award for Best Film is awarded to honor the best Filipino film of the year. Per YCC criteria, the award for Best Film "refers to vision and direction that pay sensitive and keen attention to both the language of cinema ('presentation') and social reality ('representation'), in the process refunctioning the possibilities of film as progressive art and popular culture. The Best Film citation is awarded to the Director not so much because he or she is the auteur or the central intelligence of the film, but because his or her work lies at the conjuncture which coordinates filmmaking."

Directors with multiple Best Film wins include:
  Jose Javier Reyes (Hindi Kita Malilimutan, 1993; Batang PX, 1997; and Minsan May Isang Puso, 2001)
  Adolfo Alix Jr. (Adela, 2008; Haruo, 2011; and Porno, 2013)
  Chito Roño (Bata, Bata, Paano Ka Ginawa?, 1998; and Dekada '70, 2002)
  Mario O'Hara (Sisa, 1999; and Babae sa Breakwater, 2003)
  Brillante Mendoza (Masahista, 2005; and Foster Child, 2007)
  Ralston Jover (Bakal Boys, 2009; and Da Dog Show, 2015)

{| class="wikitable" style="width:95%;" cellpadding="5"
|-
! style="width:100px;"|Year
! style="width:450px;"|Winner/s
! style="width:450px;"|Director/s
|-
|style="text-align:center;"|1990||Andrea, Paano Ba ang Maging Isang Ina?|| Gil Portes
|-
|style="text-align:center;"|1991||Sa Kabila ng Lahat|| Lino Brocka
|-
|style="text-align:center;"|1992||Ikaw Pa Lang ang Minahal|| Carlos Siguion-Reyna
|-
|style="text-align:center;"|1993||Hindi Kita Malilimutan|| Jose Javier Reyes
|-
|style="text-align:center;"|1994||VampiraPangako ng Kahapon|| Joey RomeroJoel Lamangan
|-
|style="text-align:center;"|1995||Nena|| Ike Jarlego Jr.
|-
|style="text-align:center;"|1996||Mumbaki|| Jose Antonio Perez
|-
|style="text-align:center;"|1997||Batang PX|| Jose Javier Reyes
|-
|style="text-align:center;"|1998||Bata, Bata, Paano Ka Ginawa?|| Chito Roño
|-
|style="text-align:center;"|1999||Sisa|| Mario O'Hara
|-
|style="text-align:center;"|2000||Bayaning Third WorldTanging Yaman|| Mike De LeonLaurice Guillen
|-
|style="text-align:center;"|2001||Minsan May Isang Puso|| Jose Javier Reyes
|-
|style="text-align:center;"|2002||Dekada '70|| Chito Roño
|-
|style="text-align:center;"|2003||Babae sa Breakwater|| Mario O'Hara
|-
|style="text-align:center;"|2004||Minsan Pa|| Jeffrey Jeturian
|-
|style="text-align:center;"|2005||Masahista|| Brillante Mendoza
|-
|style="text-align:center;"|2006||Inang Yaya|| Pablo Biglang-awa and Veronica Velasco
|-
|style="text-align:center;"|2007||Foster Child|| Brillante Mendoza
|-
|style="text-align:center;"|2008||Adela|| Adolfo Alix Jr.
|-
|style="text-align:center;"|2009||Bakal Boys|| Ralston Jover
|-
|style="text-align:center;"|2010||Himpapawid|| Raymond Red
|-
|style="text-align:center;"|2011||Haruo|| Adolfo Alix Jr.
|-
|style="text-align:center;"|2012||Qiyamah|| Gutierrez Mangansakan II
|-
|style="text-align:center;"|2013 ||Porno|| Adolfo Alix Jr.
|-
|style="text-align:center;"|2014||No winner|| 
|-
|style="text-align:center;"|2015||Da Dog Show|| Ralston Jover
|-
|style="text-align:center;"|2016||Women of the Weeping River|| Sheron Dayoc
|-
|style="text-align:center;"|2017||Baconaua|| Joseph Israel Laban
|-
|style="text-align:center;"|2018||Sa Palad ng Dantaong Kulang|| Jewel Maranan
|-
|style="text-align:center;"|2019||Edward|| Thop Nazareno
|-
|style="text-align:center;"|2020
|Death of NintendoKintsugi|Raya MartinLawrence Fajardo
|}

 Best Performance 

The YCC award for Best Performance refers to acting, to the playing out of a role or character that implicates emotion, feeling, and experience in the social conditions of the personal and in the political economies of habit and gesture and how these forge the body politic. The Best Performance citation is handed to the Performer, whether male or female, adult or child, in major or supporting role, individual or ensemble.

Since there is only one award given for performance (whether male or female, lead or supporting, individual or ensemble), the YCC Best Performance Award is highly coveted in the Philippine film industry. Since the first awarding in 1991, Nora Aunor has the most nominations with thirteen, and the most wins with five.

Aunor has been nominated for:

 Andrea, Paano Ba ang Maging Isang Ina? (1990)
 Ang Totoong Buhay ni Pacita M. (1991)
 Inay (1993)
 The Flor Contemplacion Story (1995)
 Muling Umawit ang Puso (1995)
 Bakit May Kahapon Pa? (1996)
 Babae (1997)
 Naglalayag (2004)
 Thy Womb (2012)
 Ang Kwento Ni Mabuti (2013)
 Taklub (2015)Tuos (2016) (double nomination: single performance / Duo)

She won for Andrea, Paano Ba ang Maging Isang Ina?, Ang Totoong Buhay ni Pacita M., Inay, The Flor Contemplacion Story, and Thy Womb.

Other multiple winners include:
 Maricel Soriano (Ikaw Pa Lang ang Minahal, 1992; Vampira, 1994; and Inang Yaya, 2006)
 Aga Muhlach (Joey Boy Munti, 1991; and Hindi Kita Malilimutan) 
 Vilma Santos (Bata, Bata, Paano Ka Ginawa?, 1998; and Dekada '70, 2002)

 Best Screenplay 

Best Screenplay refers to the rhetoric of writing for film that articulates the complexity of social life and personal perturbation through narrative logic or political conviction; or simply through well-thought out dramatic tension that explores contestation between the personal and the political, the individual and the collective, the private and the public. The Best Screenplay award is given to the writer of the film.

Multiple Best Screenplay winners include:
  Jose Javier Reyes (Dinampot Ka Lang sa Putik, 1991; Iisa Pa Lamang, 1992; Hindi Kita Malilimutan, 1993; Batang PX, 1997; and Minsan May Isang Puso 2001)
  Ralston Jover (Foster Child, 2007; Porno, 2013; Da Dog Show, 2015; and Mrs., 2016)
  Lualhati Bautista (Nena, 1995; Bata, Bata, Paano Ka Ginawa?, 1998; and Dekada '70, 2002)
  Mario O'Hara (Sisa, 1999; and Babae sa Breakwater, 2003)
  Armando Lao (Minsan Pa, 2004; and Biyaheng Lupa, 2009)
  John Bedia (The Chanters, 2017; and Edward, 2019)

 Best Achievement in Editing 

Best Achievement in Editing refers to the configuration of relationships of time and space among scenes in a film that is able to synthesize, engage in collision, reconcile, or transgress connections through the complex interplay of mise-en-scene and montage. The Best Editing trophy is given to the editor.

Three editors have received the YCC Editing award twice: 
  Jesus Navarro (Ikaw Pa Lang ang Minahal, 1992; and Milagros, 1997)
  Roberto Vasadre (Sana Pag-ibig Na, 1998; and Pila Balde, 1999)
  Vito Cajili (Malikmata, 2003; and Spirit of the Glass, 2004)

 Best Achievement in Cinematography and Visual Design 

Best Achievement in Cinematography and Visual Design refers to the mise-en-scene and its visual/plastic qualities production design, lighting, art direction, visual effects that lend form to whatever representation is projected on screen. The Best Cinematography and Visual Design honor is conferred on the cinematographer and the production designer.

Multiple category winners include:

For Cinematography:
  Jun Pereira (Bakit Kay Tagal ng Sandali?, 1990; and Kailan Ka Magiging Akin?, 1991)
  Rey de Leon (Babae sa Bubungang Lata, 1998; and Babae sa Breakwater, 2003)
  Yam Laranas (Ikaw Lamang Hanggang Ngayon, 2002; and Sigaw, 2004)
  Albert Banzon (Adela, 2008; and Kalayaan, 2012)

For Production Design:
  Charlie Arceo (Kailan Ka Magiging Akin?, 1991; and Ikaw Lang, 1993)
  Sammy Aranzamendez (Ikaw Lamang Hanggang Ngayon, 2002; and Sigaw, 2004)
  Adolfo Alix Jr. (Adela, 2008; and Kalayaan, 2012)

 Best Achievement in Sound and Aural Orchestration 

Best Achievement in Sound and Aural Orchestration refers to the rendering of the auditory aspects of film music, natural sound, sound effects as these are counterposed against or harmonized with the language of image, and so become meaningful sign systems on their own. The Best Sound citation is awarded to the sound engineer and the musical scorer or music curator.

Multiple category winners include:

For Sound Design:
  Albert Michael Idioma (Curacha: Ang Babaeng Walang Pahinga, 1998; Phone Sex, 1999; Sugatang Puso, 2000; Minsan May Isang Puso, 2001; Dekada '70, 2002; Sigaw, 2004; and Porno, 2013)
  Ramon Reyes (Kung Mawawala Ka Pa, 1993; Sana Dalawa ang Puso Ko, 1994; Mumbaki, 1996; and Milagros, 1997)
  Arnold Reodica (Sigaw, 2004; and Ang Sayaw ng Dalawang Kaliwang Paa, 2011)
  Mark Locsin (Inang Yaya, 2006; and Endo, 2007)
  Ditoy Aguila (Adela, 2008; and Biyaheng Lupa, 2009)
  Mikko Quizon (Nervous Translation, 2017; and Never Not Love You, 2018)

For Music:
  Jesse Lucas (Phone Sex, 1999; Sugatang Puso, 2000; Minsan May Isang Puso, 2001; Babae sa Breakwater, 2003; and Sigaw, 2004)
  Nonong Buencamino (Sana Dalawa ang Puso Ko, 1994; Milagros, 1997; Dekada '70, 2002; and Inang Yaya, 2006)
  Ryan Cayabyab (Hihintayin Kita sa Langit, 1991; and Kung Mawawala Ka Pa, 1993)
  Jaime Fabregas (Mumbaki, 1996; and Curacha: Ang Babaeng Walang Pahinga, 1998)
  Jerrold Tarog (Masahista, 2005; and Shake, Rattle and Roll 12: Punerarya'', 2010)

Best First Feature  
In 2013, the Young Critics Circle added a new category to their six existing awards as a recognition of the growing number of new filmmakers in the country. The Best First Feature award is given to the three most outstanding debut feature films (narrative, experimental, or documentary) of the year.

See also
 Film awards bodies in the Philippines

References

Additional sources
 Tale of ex-Yakuza, Diana Zubiri lead Young Critics Circle awardees - Interaksyon.com/TV5 (June 19, 2012). Retrieved June 28, 2012

External links

 Young Critics Circle - official accounts:
 on Wordpress
 on Facebook
 on Twitter
 Young Critics Circle on IMDb

Philippine film awards
Young Critics Circle Awards